Redline refers to the maximum safe speed of an engine.

Redline or redlining may also refer to:

Brands and enterprises
 Redline (bicycle brand), an American bicycle manufacturer
 Redline Coaches, a Tasmanian bus company
 Redline Communications, a Canadian company
 Redline Records, an Australian record label
 Redline, a series of boats produced by C&C Yachts

Film
 Redline (1997 film) or Deathline, a Canadian-Dutch science fiction film
 Redline (2007 film), an American action film
 Redline (2009 film), a Japanese anime film

Video games
 Redline (1999 video game), a first-person shooter/car combat game for Windows
 Redline (2006 video game), a racing game for Mac OS X
 Street Legal Racing: Redline, a 2003 Windows game

Other uses
 Redline (EP), by Seventh Day Slumber, 2015
 Redlining, in the United States, a discriminatory practice
 Document comparison, or redlining, a computer process

See also 
 Red Line (disambiguation)